Tertius Kruger (born 9 August 1993) is a South African professional rugby union player for the in the Pro14. His regular position is centre.

Career

SWD Eagles

Kruger was involved in provincial rugby since primary school level, representing the SWD Eagles at the Under-13 Craven Week competition in 2006. He was also selected to represent the SWD Eagles at Under-16 level, playing at the Grant Khomo Week in 2009, and at Under-18 level, playing at South Africa's premier high school rugby union tournament, the Craven Week, in 2011.

Free State / UFS Shimlas

Free State lost out on a semi-final spot in the competition, however, finishing in sixth spot.

In 2013, he made the step up to Under-21 level and played in ten of the  team's matches during the 2013 Under-21 Provincial Championship. He again scored two tries – against eventual champions  in an 18–16 victory in the opening match of their season and against  – as his side once again missed out on the semi-finals by finishing fifth.

Kruger started the 2014 season by representing university side  in the 2014 Varsity Cup. He made four appearances and scored against  in a 52–13 win as UFS Shimlas finished the competition in fifth spot. His side finished fourth to qualify for the semi-final, where they were beaten by Western Province.

Kruger started seven of the ' matches during the 2015 Varsity Cup competition, helping Shimlas finish top of the log and qualify for a home semi-final. He featured in their semi-final match against two-time champions  where Shimlas secured a 21–10 victory to help them qualify for their first ever final.

Free State Cheetahs

Kruger was included in the  senior squad for the first time for the 2015 Currie Cup Premier Division and was initially named on the bench for their Round Two match against , but subsequently replaced by loose-forward Tienie Burger. He was again named on the bench for their Round Four match against the same opposition, but failed to make an appearance.

Southern Kings

Kruger moved to Port Elizabeth to join the  after the 2018 Currie Cup Premier Division.

Personal life

Kruger is the younger brother of number eight De Wet Kruger.

References

South African rugby union players
Living people
1993 births
People from Randfontein
Rugby union centres
Free State Cheetahs players
Southern Kings players
Sportspeople from Gauteng
Griffons (rugby union) players
Griquas (rugby union) players
Cheetahs (rugby union) players